Portishead railway station was opened by the Bristol and Portishead Pier and Railway in 1867; it was approximately  from the town of Portishead, North Somerset, England. After the opening of the Pier in 1870, the line was extended with an additional railway station opened by the pier. The Pier station closed first; and the original Portishead station closed in 1954, with a new Portishead station opened nearer the town. The 1954 station closed in 1964 when passenger services were withdrawn from the line.

A resited new station is due to be opened to passenger traffic as part of MetroWest, a scheme to increase rail services in the Bristol area.

History

Portishead railway station was opened by the Bristol and Portishead Pier and Railway on 18 April 1867; it was approximately   beyond the village of Portishead  and handled both passengers and goods. The Pier was opened in 1870 and line was extended to the pier, with an additional railway station opened by the pier. By 1904, this was listed as a goods-only station, known as "Portishead Dock".

In the 1920s, the coal-fired Portishead power station was built adjacent to Portishead railway station; and the power station was extended in 1948 to increase its capacity. In 1949, building work also started on an additional power station, Portishead B power station. This led to the closure and demolition of the original Portishead railway station. It was replaced on the same day, 4 January 1954, by a new station  nearer the centre of Portishead and Bristol to the designs of the Western Region Assistant Architect, Ian J. Campbell.

The 1954 station was closed by the "Beeching Axe" on 7 September 1964, when passenger services ceased on the line. Freight services continued on the line until the early 1980s.

{{rail line|previous=Portbury<small>Line and station closed</small>|route=Great Western RailwayPortishead Railway|col=}}

 Future 
In April 2019 the Department for Transport committed £31.9m to cover the shortfall in finance for MetroWest Phase 1, meaning that funding for the new station and reopened line has now been secured. In November 2019 North Somerset Council submitted a Development Consent Order (DCO) application to the Planning Inspectorate, which seeks powers to build and operate the disused section of railway from Portishead to Pill, gain environmental consent to undertake works to the existing freight railway through the Avon Gorge and obtain powers for the compulsory acquisition of land. The Secretary of State for Transport is expected to make a decision within 18 months. Subject to final business case approval, construction work is expected to start on the line in December 2021 and then take around two years to complete.

References
Notes

Sources

 
 Crowhurst, Ken (2001). Images of England: Portishead''. Stroud: Tempus Publishing Limited. .
 

Disused railway stations in Somerset
Former Great Western Railway stations
Railway stations in Great Britain opened in 1867
Railway stations in Great Britain closed in 1954
Railway stations in Great Britain opened in 1954
Railway stations in Great Britain closed in 1964
Beeching closures in England
Proposed railway stations in England
Portishead, Somerset
Ian Campbell railway stations